Samsun Clock Tower is the tower that gives its name to Samsun Saathane Square located in Ilkadim district of Samsun.

History 
Abdul Hamid II sent an instruction to the governors of the Ottoman Empire in 1886 ordering the erection of clock towers in cities to commemorate the tenth anniversary of his accession to the throne. After the issuance of this order, construction began on the clock tower in the area known as "Iskele Square" in Trabzon Province. Constructed began in 1886 and was completed in 1887. An opening ceremony was held on Monday, May 9, 1887. Ünye stone was the primary material used in the construction of the clock tower. The tower was designed and constructed under the guidance of a Belgian-born French engineer. The tower, which was built with a polygonal base and body was constructed using an overlapping stonework system. Samsun at the time of construction was mostly a city of low-rise wooden homes. The tower was built above them in order to demonstrate grandeur and display time.

In 1933, the clock tower underwent its first and most significant renovation. The clock, which lagged behind the technology of the period, was removed and replaced with a new system clock powered by electricity. In addition, a siren system has been added to the tower in order to warn the public in case of fire.

After 1943 Ladik Earthquake, the clock tower was badly damaged and a commission was established to oversee the repair of the clock tower. In the report given by the commission to Samsun Governor Rüknettin Nasuhioğlu on 27 June 1944 by the commission, it was determined that there was no possibility of repairing the clock tower or preserving it as it was as a result of the damage from the earthquake. It was stated in the report that the structure would either collapse on its own or cause loss of life and property, so on 3 August 1948, the dismantling of the tower began. The clock of the tower was sold to the Municipality of Ladik for 550 liras in the same year in order to be attached to the Ladik Clock Tower.

A replacement clock tower was not built on Samsun Saathane Square until 1977. In 1977, a new clock tower was built as part of the clock tower project drawn by Architect Kemal Taner. The clocks on the new tower were brought from Switzerland and fitted to the structure.

On September 1, 2000, the reconstruction of the clock tower was started by the Samsun Metropolitan Municipality. This work was initiated because the clock tower erected in 1977 did not resemble the original 1887 structure. This historical restoration project took five months to complete. The opening of the third and newest clock tower, which was built faithfully to the original design was held on January 30, 2001. Ladik andesite stone was used as the material in the new tower, and the interlocking stone mesh system was used as the construction technique. The inner body was made of reinforced concrete and the foundation was laid with 4 15-meter bored piles. While the inner diameter of the new tower is 1.20 meters and the outer diameter is 2 meters, its height is 16.50 meters.

Replica Towers 
There is a model of the Samsun Clock Tower in the Time Witness Clock Towers Park, located in Safranbolu which opened in 2012.

Gallery

See also 
 Samsun Saathane Square
 Ladik Clock Tower
 Republic Square (Samsun)

References

External links 
 On WowTurkey.com Clock tower built in 1977
 On YouTube.com Saathane's Ticks

Ottoman architecture in Turkey
Samsun